Coptarthria is a genus of snout moths. It was described by Ragonot, in 1893, and contains the species C. dasypyga. It is found in Colombia and Guatemala.

References

Phycitinae
Monotypic moth genera
Moths of Central America
Moths of South America